The following outline is provided as an overview of and topical guide to energy development:

Energy development – the effort to provide sufficient primary energy sources and secondary energy forms for supply, cost, impact on air pollution and water pollution, mitigation of climate change with renewable energy.

Overview 

Energy development

History 

energy development#History
 History of fossil fuel
 History of vegetable oil used as fuel
 History of biodiesel
 History of electromagnetism and electricity generation
 History of nuclear power
 History of fusion energy research
 History of wind power
 History of geothermal power
 History of energy storage

Concepts 
 1973 oil crisis
 Climate change
 Electric power transmission
 Net metering
 OPEC
 Peak oil
 Photovoltaics
 Pipeline transport
 Sustainable development
 Synthetic fuel
 United States Department of Energy
 United States Atomic Energy Commission

See also 

List of emerging energy technologies

External links

 RECaBS REcalculator Interactive Renewable Energy Calculator - compare renewable energy to conventional energy sources

Energy development
Energy development

Energy development, Outline of